Martti Maatela (21 September 1935 – 26 November 2013) was a Finnish skier. He competed in the Nordic combined event at the 1960 Winter Olympics.

References

External links
 

1935 births
2013 deaths
Finnish male Nordic combined skiers
Olympic Nordic combined skiers of Finland
Nordic combined skiers at the 1960 Winter Olympics
People from Rovaniemi
Sportspeople from Lapland (Finland)
20th-century Finnish people